Luc Van de Vondel (born 9 February 1965) is a Belgian breaststroke swimmer. He competed in two events at the 1988 Summer Olympics.

References

External links
 

1965 births
Living people
Belgian male breaststroke swimmers
Olympic swimmers of Belgium
Swimmers at the 1988 Summer Olympics
Sportspeople from Aalst, Belgium